Palamède may refer to:

Palamède de Forbin (died 1508), Provençal lord and minister
Le Palamède, a former chess periodical

See also
Palamedes (disambiguation)